NGC 755 is an emission line spiral galaxy in the constellation of Cetus. The galaxy's velocity of 1641.2 km/s was used to calculate its distance using the Tully–Fisher relation. Its dark matter halo was found to be core-dominated, in agreement with predictions from the lambda-CDM model of cosmology.

References

External links 
 
 ned.ipac.caltech.edu

0755
Cetus (constellation)
Barred spiral galaxies
007262